Einar Sven Axel Eriksson (20 October 1921 – 5 August 2009) was a Swedish featherweight weightlifter who won three bronze medals at the world and European Championships in 1950 and 1953. He placed 17th at the 1952 Summer Olympics.

References

1921 births
2009 deaths
Olympic weightlifters of Sweden
Weightlifters at the 1952 Summer Olympics
European Weightlifting Championships medalists
World Weightlifting Championships medalists
People from Ljusdal Municipality
Sportspeople from Gävleborg County